The Adam A500 is an American six-seat civil utility aircraft that was produced by Adam Aircraft Industries. The aircraft is of pod-and-boom, push-pull configuration with its two Continental TSIO-550-E piston engines mounted to provide centerline thrust.

Design and development

The A500 was developed from the M-309 CarbonAero technology demonstrator designed by Burt Rutan and built by Scaled Composites at the Mojave Airport. The "309" designation refers to this being Rutan's 309th aircraft design. 
The 309 first flew in March 2000, but the aircraft has since been gutted and was used as a static display outside the Adam Aircraft Industries headquarters. In 2006 the 309 was loaned to the Wings Over the Rockies Air and Space Museum and is now on display.

Compared to conventional twin-engine installations, the centerline thrust arrangement reduces drag and maximizes the controllability of the aircraft should one engine malfunction or fail.  This engine configuration was used by the similar Cessna Skymaster. The A500 airframe is largely built of carbon fiber epoxy composite materials with a Nomex honeycomb core. Other features include cabin pressurization.

The prototype A500 first flew on July 11, 2002, and was FAA certified in May 2005.

Adam Aircraft ceased operations on 11 February 2008, and filed for Chapter 7 bankruptcy on 19 February 2008, having delivered seven A500s.

In April 2008 Adam Aircraft was purchased from bankruptcy by AAI Acquisition Inc. At the time of purchase this new company indicated that they would pursue certification of the A700 jet as a priority and that the A500 would not be produced due to the continuing poor market for piston-engined aircraft. AAI went out of business in April 2009 without producing any aircraft.

In July 2009 there was an indication that a new buyer, Thomas Hsueh of Triton America based at Skagit Regional Airport in Burlington, Washington, was interested in purchasing the A500 design and returning the aircraft to production.

In April 2011 Triton Aerospace announced that they had acquired the assets of Adam Aircraft including the aircraft type certificate and intend to return the A500 to production.

In April 2011 Triton Aerospace announced that they will redesign the aircraft using what Thomas Hsueh, owner of Triton Aerospace, termed "proper engineering" to shed  of empty weight and recertify it with the intention of putting it back into production. The aircraft will also be changed to a turboprop, with twin engined and rear-engined-only versions. A new prototype was expected in 2013 with re-certification to follow. Hsueh indicated that for now production is planned for the US, but costs may require moving the assembly line to China or even a lower cost country such as Mexico.

By 2013 the Triton website had been taken down and the URL sold. It is likely that the company has gone out of business.

A500 payload issues

This resulted in a change of useful load from a forecast .

This means that the A500 cannot carry full fuel and one standard weight adult male or female  pilot.

Adam Aircraft had intended to address the lack of useful load by demonstrating that the current  of unusable fuel is actually .

Support and aircraft type club formation
The five A500s in private service have run into problems obtaining parts and at least one was reported as grounded due to parts issues in August 2008.

The aircraft owners organized an aircraft type club, the A500 Owners Association, with the goal of convincing the new owners of the design at that time, AAI Acquisitions to provide parts support for the existing aircraft.

AAI's head of customer support, Jan D'Angelo, responded in August 2008, saying:

Aircraft on display
Wings Over the Rockies Air and Space Museum - M309 proof of concept design

Specifications (A500)

See also

References

External links

 Adam Aircraft website archives on Archive.org
 Triton Aerospace
 Wings Over the Rockies Air and Space Museum

Adam Aircraft Industries aircraft
Twin-engined push-pull aircraft
Scaled Composites
Twin-boom aircraft
2000s United States civil utility aircraft
2000s United States experimental aircraft
Aircraft first flown in 2002